Symphony No. 2 is the second symphony by Estonian composer Arvo Pärt, written in 1966.

Recordings
 Arvo Pärt, BIS (1989); Bamberg Symphony Orchestra, conductor Neeme Järvi
 Arvo Pärt. Collage, Chandos (1993); Philharmonia Orchestra, conductor Neeme Järvi
 Pro & contra. Arvo Pärt, Virgin classics (2004); Estonian National Symphony Orchestra, conductor Paavo Järvi
 The Sound of Arvo Pärt, Parlophone, Warner (2015); Estonian National Symphony Orchestra, conductor Paavo Järvi
 Arvo Pärt. The Symphonies, ECM (2018); Wrocław NFM Philharmonic Orchestra, conductor Tõnu Kaljuste

References

Symphonies by Arvo Pärt
1966 compositions
Part